The Pander Society is an informal organisation  founded in 1967 for the promotion of the study of conodont palaeontology. It publishes an annual newsletter. Although there are regular meetings of the Pander Society, at the Annual Meeting of the Geological Society of America, at European Conodont Symposia (ECOS for short), and elsewhere, any meeting of three or more "Panderers" is considered an official meeting of the "Pander Society". The society is headed by the Chief Panderer, currently Maria Cristina Perri of the Università di Bologna. The society confers two awards, the Pander Medal for a lifetime of achievement in conodont palaeontology, and the Hinde Medal for an outstanding contribution to conodont palaeontology by a young Panderer.

Heinz Christian Pander (1794–1865) is credited as the first scientist to describe primitive creatures known as conodonts.

Previous Chief Panderers
 Peter von Bitter
 Richard Aldridge
 Raymond L. Ethington
 Walter C. Sweet

Pander Medalists

 John Huddle
 Samuel Ellison
 Walter Sweet
 Anita G. Harris
 Carl Rexroad
 Ray Ethington
 William Furnish
 Heinz Beckmann
 Willi Ziegler
 Maurits Lindström
 Gilbert Klapper
 Stig Bergström
 Klaus Müller
 Lennart Jeppsson
 Richard Aldridge
 Pierre Bultynck

Hinde Medallists
 Mark Purnell (2006)

External links
 Website

References

Biology societies
Paleontological institutions and organizations
 Pander Society